Bergschenhoek is a town and former municipality in the municipality of Lansingerland, in the province of South Holland, Netherlands. It is situated roughly 10 km to the north of Rotterdam. The town had a population of 18,475 in 2019, and covered an area of 15.52 km² (5.99 mile²) of which 0.63 km² (0.24 mile²) is water. On 1 January 2007, the town was merged with neighbouring towns Berkel en Rodenrijs and Bleiswijk to form the new municipality Lansingerland; these three towns collectively are known locally as the "3B Hoek".

Due to the continuing influx of people to Bergschenhoek, it is in a constant state of expansion and is now predominantly a commuter town as most of its residents work in the neighbouring cities, such as The Hague and Rotterdam. The town had a large population increase since 1990, because of the Vinex-plans. The town grew from 7,600 inhabitants in 1990 to nearly 18,500 in 2019.

The name of the town is derived from a district of the nearby city of Rotterdam, Hillegersberg. There was a road leading to this municipality. On a corner of this road ('hoek' in Dutch) a settlement grew, leading to a village. This village was named after Hillegersberg, and the corner was incorporated in the name, hence the name (Hillegers)Bergschenhoek.

External links
Official Website

Municipalities of the Netherlands disestablished in 2007
Populated places in South Holland
Former municipalities of South Holland
Lansingerland